Harry Tracy, Desperado is a 1982 Canadian drama Western film starring Bruce Dern and Helen Shaver. It was directed by William A. Graham, and filmed on-location in Historical Barkerville, British Columbia. "My Love for You" was sung by Gordon Lightfoot, who also appears as U.S. Marshal Nathan. The film was released on DVD under the title Harry Tracy: The Last of the Wild Bunch in the United States.

Plot
By the end of the 19th century, Butch Cassidy, the Sundance Kid, John Wesley Hardin, and virtually all of the Old West's legendary outlaws are either dead or in jail pending execution-all of them, that is, except train robber and escape artist extraordinaire, Harry Tracy.

As the last survivor of the Wild Bunch, Harry pulls off a series of profitable robberies before making his way west to Portland, Oregon, in search of Catherine Tuttle, a judge's daughter with whom he is in love. Instead, Harry is betrayed, arrested, and imprisoned.

Tracy escapes and becomes the target of the largest manhunt in the history of North America. He seeks out Catherine, who joins him in his flight, and their love deepens under the constant threat of capture. With hundreds of posses and national guardsmen on their heels, Tracy knows that he has only two options: surrender or die. When a posse traps Tracy in a barn, he kills himself rather than return to jail.

Production
The film was shot throughout Alberta and British Columbia, Canada. The farm of Gordon Lightfoot's character was previously featured in the 1978 film Superman: The Movie.
The Portland street scenes including a period street-car were filmed in Victoria, B.C. where the pavement of a long block of Johnson Street was covered with dirt and rails were installed to replicate Portland of the era.  Interior shots were done inside a local period house and horseback chase scenes were filmed along shoreline trails at Rathtrevor Beach Provincial Park. From 1946 to 1952, the old farm house and barn were owned by the Spiritual Community of Christ, a commune of former Sons of Freedom, and later bought by the Corry de Condelo family who rented it in 1980 for the movie.

Recognition
 1983
 Genie Award for Best Achievement in Film Editing - Ron Wisman - Nominated
 Genie Award for Best Achievement in Overall Sound - Rod Haykin, David Appleby, Don White - Nominated
 Genie Award for Best Achievement in Sound Editing - Bruce Carwardine, Brian French, Glen Gauthier, Tim Roberts, Brian Rosen - Nominated
 Genie Award for Best Motion Picture - Ronald I. Cohen - Nominee
 Genie Award for Best Original Song - Leslie Pouliot - Nominee
 Genie Award for Best Performance by a Foreign Actor - Bruce Dern - Nominated
 Genie Award for Best Original Screenplay - David Lee Henry - Nominated

See also

 Harry Tracy

References

External links
 1982 Movie - Filmed in the Quesnel Area, (114 min.) YouTube (Accessed: March 21, 2022)
 
 
 Harry Tracy at Turner Classic Movies

1982 films
English-language Canadian films
1980s English-language films
1982 Western (genre) films
Canadian Western (genre) films
Films set in the 1900s
Films shot in British Columbia
Films scored by Maribeth Solomon
Films scored by Micky Erbe
Films directed by William Graham (director)
1982 drama films
1980s Canadian films